Events from the year 1985 in the United Arab Emirates.

Incumbents
President: Zayed bin Sultan Al Nahyan 
Prime Minister: Rashid bin Saeed Al Maktoum

Establishments

 Dubai International School.

Emirates Airlines.

References

 
Years of the 20th century in the United Arab Emirates
United Arab Emirates
United Arab Emirates
1980s in the United Arab Emirates